Sacha John Edward Lord (born 26 January 1972) is a co-creator of the Parklife festival and The Warehouse Project. He is also the Night Time Economy Adviser for Greater Manchester, appointed by Mayor Andy Burnham.

Early life 

Lord was born in Altrincham, Greater Manchester, and grew up in the town. His father was a textile merchant, and his mother an interior designer. Lord was educated at Manchester Grammar School, leaving at aged 18 having gained two Us and an E at A-Level.  After leaving school, Lord went on to work at a clothes shop in Altrincham, and later started a market stall at Liverpool market, selling leather jackets. After quitting his market job, Lord quickly found himself involved in the rave-influenced music scene, and spent most of his time listening to The Stone Roses, Prince, The Smiths and Bowie.

Career

The Warehouse Project 

Inspired by the success of the events, Lord launched the Warehouse Project, a series of rave events running annually from September to 1 January, in 2006 with Co-Founder Sam Kandel.

It began operations in the disused Boddingtons Brewery in Strangeways, and then moved into a space under Manchester Piccadilly station, on Store Street, which previously served as an air raid shelter.

The opening night of The Warehouse Project was described by Lord as "a nightmare" due to its location next to the prison, and he later revealed the Governor of HM Prison Manchester had called to say it was disturbing inmates.

The Warehouse Project went onto feature some of the most in-demand names in international house and techno music, including New Order, The Chemical Brothers and Calvin Harris - whose appearance, Lord later went onto reveal, was a favour for an A&R at Sony. Lord revealed he put Harris ( an unknown DJ at the time) on the 21.30 slot, despite doors only opening at 22.00.

The Warehouse Project attracted 100,000 people in its first year and has continued to sell out annually. 

In 2019, Lord and Kandel moved The Warehouse Project to Depot at the former Manchester Mayfield railway station - a move which saw it become the biggest club night in the UK with a 10,000 person capacity. The move also put it on a par with the current Guinness Book of World Records holder of the largest nightclub in the world, Privilege in Ibiza, which can also hold 10,000 revellers.

Lord has been a supporter for drug safety campaigns and has called for drug testing laboratories and on site forensic testing at all UK clubs and festivals. Although not responsible for the incident, Lord's campaigning followed the death of Nick Bonnie, 30, in 2013 who was found collapsed at a Warehouse Project rave after taking almost 15 times the standard recreational dose of MDMA.

The Warehouse Project events were put on hold in 2020 due to the Coronavirus pandemic, but returned in 2021 following the easing of lockdown restrictions.

Parklife Festival 

Lord co-created Parklife Festival in 2010, to celebrate artists across indie, house and techno music. It has hosted some of the biggest names in music, including Snoop Dogg, Liam Gallagher and Skepta.

The weekend festival, which moved from Platt Fields to Heaton Park, Manchester in 2012, attracts 80,000 visitors each year.

The Festival employs over 4,500 people over the weekend. Each year, it raises over £100k for the Parklife Community Foundation, that is distributed to help local causes.

Parklife Festival was cancelled in 2020 due to the Coronavirus pandemic and rescheduled to September 2021 following the easing of lockdown restrictions.

Hide Out Festival 

Lord was one of the creators of Croatia's Hideout Festival, a five-day alternative music extravaganza held on the island of Pag, Croatia, in 2011. It has sold out every single year since its conception.

Public life

Night Time Economy Adviser
In 2018, Mayor of Greater Manchester, Andy Burnham, appointed Lord as Greater Manchester's first Night Time Economy Adviser, following in the footsteps of Amy Lamé, who was appointed by London Mayor Sadiq Khan in 2016 to be the first London night czar.

Lord is not paid for the role and any income created from the role has been donated directly to charity. He did not apply for the post, although it has been established that he lobbied Burnham on the importance of nightlife before the Labour politician won the inaugural mayoral elections in May 2017.

The role acts to advise Burnham and the Greater Manchester Combined Authority (GMCA) on all issues relating to the night-time economy, providing a voice for workers, operators and the industry as a whole.

Lord has since announced a raft of recommendations to improve safety, transport and cultural diversity in the region, including the introduction of later opening hours for greater accessibility and the development of night-time transport links to better serve under-represented communities on the outskirts of the region.

In August 2018, Lord advocated for a fair wage policy for nighttime hospitality staff, including full transparency tipping for bar and restaurant workers.

In January 2020, Lord appeared on BBC Question Time, alongside Conservative Party chairman James Cleverly, Labour's Sarah Jones, National Farmers’ Union president Minette Batters and stand-up comedian Geoff Norcott. The transmission was the last episode to be broadcast before Britain left the European Union on 31 January 2020.

Coronavirus pandemic
During the Coronavirus pandemic of 2020, Lord was catapulted into the mainstream as the leading voice for the UK night life sector, and his expertise was called on by Paul Scully, the Secretary of State for Small Business, Consumers and Labour Markets in response to helping businesses survive the lockdowns placed on the sector.

In October 2020 Lord started legal proceedings against the Government regarding the implementation of a 10pm curfew placed on hospitality venues during the Coronavirus pandemic and subsequent lockdowns, and the introduction of the substantial food policy. The policy forced hospitality venues which did not serve food to close. Lord's case argued the policy was discriminatory towards sections of society in disadvantaged areas who rely on wet-led pubs for community socialisation and cannot afford meals out. On 1 March 2021, Judge Richard Pearce upheld the argument and moved the case to the High Court for debate. The government however had already dropped the policy when their roadmap out of lockdown was published so the case did not progress any further. Lord encountered support from UKHospitality, the British Beer and Pub Association, the Night Time Industries Association, several national breweries and some local businesses. His legal team on the case were Oliver Wright and David Locke QC.

On 18 March 2021, Lord launched a new legal case against the Government over its continued closure of indoor hospitality, which he argued was unfair when compared to the reopening of non-essential retail. Lord argued hospitality venues were safer than non-essential retail stores due to their ventilation and covid-safe measures. Lord was joined by Hugh Osmond, the founder of Punch Taverns, on the legal case.

During an interview with The Telegraph regarding the case, Lord said that the Government were uninterested in discussing the case and meetings with them feel "like a nodding dog exercise" while he warned ongoing restrictions would cause "mass redundancies and mass closures like we've never seen before... If I didn't do this, I wouldn't be able to look at myself in the mirror every morning. I just want to come out of this saying I did everything I possibly could for hospitality." He has been told that his chances for success are the same as with his scotch egg fight.

On 1 April 2021, Lord and Osmond petitioned the High Court with an emergency writ to expedite the case. The petition challenged "The Health Protection (Coronavirus, Restrictions) (Steps) (England) Regulations 2021 to the extent that those Regulations provide for non-essential retail businesses to reopen before indoor hospitality businesses"  and was overseen by Mr Justice Swift who immediately requested Matt Hancock "shall by 10am on Tuesday April 6, 2021 file and serve his response to the application" to justify "why he is allowing non-essential shops to open before pubs and restaurants".

Charitable work 

Sacha Lord is patron of the Joshua Wilson Brain Tumour Charity (charity reg number 1151518).

Lord is also an avid campaigner on the role of mental health services for those working in the night time economy.

During the global Coronavirus pandemic in 2020, Lord co-founded the UnitedWeStream Manchester campaign, a livestream gig website which raised over £600,000 for businesses in the night time economy and charities in Greater Manchester including the Mayor's Homelessness Charity and music therapy charity, Nordoff Robbins, through a relief fund on the website. A number of artists performed on the live stream website, including Roger Sanchez and Paul Oakenfold.

Personal life 
Lord married Demi Mclaughlin, a category manager for the online retailer Very, in April 2022, in Capri. The wedding was postponed from 2021 due to COVID.

In 2022, he announced he had joined the Labour Party.

References 

1972 births
Living people
Music festival founders
English businesspeople
Labour Party (UK) people